Michael Thomas Keen (19 March 1940 – 12 April 2009) was an English footballer who played during the 1960s and 1970s. He was the father of former West Ham United and Stoke City player Kevin Keen.

Keen started his career at Queens Park Rangers, making his debut in 1959 against York City. He went on to play 393 league games and scored 39 goals for the club.

Keen was the captain of the QPR side that won the League Cup and Third Division Championship in 1966–67. He captained the FA tour of Australia in 1971. He scored 6 goals as they won all of their 9 games, 2 against Australia and 7 against state sides. He played for Luton Town from 1969 to 1972 until he was transferred to Watford.

He was appointed player-manager of Watford in 1973. He was sacked in 1977 shortly before a home game with Huddersfield Town, but was on the touchline during the game, which Watford won 2–0 despite having two players sent off.

He later moved into full-time management with Northampton Town, between 1978 and 1979, followed by his hometown club, Wycombe Wanderers, between January 1980 and 1984, leading them to the semi-final of the FA Trophy in 1981–82, then to the Isthmian League title in 1982–83. He went on to manage Marlow.

Keen ran two sports shops in High Wycombe. In the 1970s he owned "Keen and Busbys" jointly with fellow professional footballers from High Wycombe the brothers Viv and Martyn Busby. The shop was located in the Oxford Road, High Wycombe. In the 1980s his shop "Mike Keen Sports" opened.

Keen died after a short illness, aged 69, on 12 April 2009.

References

Managerial positions

1940 births
2009 deaths
English footballers
English football managers
Queens Park Rangers F.C. players
Luton Town F.C. players
Watford F.C. players
Watford F.C. managers
Northampton Town F.C. managers
Wycombe Wanderers F.C. managers
Marlow F.C. managers
Sportspeople from High Wycombe
English Football League players
Association football midfielders
Footballers from Buckinghamshire